Comondú may refer to:
 Comondú Municipality, a municipality of the Mexican state of Baja California Sur
 Misión San José de Comondú, a Jesuit mission established early in the 18th century in Baja California Sur, Mexico
 The Comondú complex, an archaeological pattern in Baja California, Mexico
 Comondú-La Purísima, a volcano in Mexico
 Humedal Los Comondú, a Ramsar wetland in Mexico
 Comondú formation, a geological formation in the San Borja volcanic field